The Book of Unwritten Tales 2 is a comedy point-and-click adventure video game created by the German developer King Art Games. The game, a sequel to The Book of Unwritten Tales, was published by Nordic Games on 20 February 2015 for Linux, Microsoft Windows and OS X. Console ports for the PlayStation 3, PlayStation 4, Xbox 360 and Xbox One were released in September 2015. The PlayStation 3 and Xbox 360 versions were released exclusively as digital downloads. The Wii U version was released on 7 June 2016 in Europe and North America. A Nintendo Switch version was announced, and released on 5 February 2019.

Plot

The game's four protagonists, Wilbur a novice gnome mage, Nate a narcissistic human, Ivo a pregnant elf princess and a furry alien creature known as "Critter", partake in an adventure in the fantasy land of Aventasia. A magic force is turning beasts into puppies and castles into dollhouses. The four heroes reunite to combat this unusual transformation of Aventasia.

Production
The English translation and voice recording were provided by OMUK. The game was successfully crowdfunded on Kickstarter. Before its official release, the game was launched on Steam Early Access. The game's launch trailer poked fun at video game monetisation strategies, such as free-to-play and microtransactions.

The game made its way to PlayStation 4 and Xbox One in both physical and digital form, for a budget price of $20 on 18 September 2015. PlayStation 3 and Xbox 360 versions were also released, but these remained exclusively digital downloads; the PlayStation 3 version retained the reduced price of the eighth-generation consoles, while the Xbox 360 launched at a cost of $30.

Reception

According to Jan Theysen of King Art Games, The Book of Unwritten Tales 2 was the company's most successful game, with sales "in the mid six-digit range" by 2014.

The Book of Unwritten Tales 2 received positive reviews from critics. The game has a Metacritic score of 80/100. Game Revolution commented: "Is The Book of Unwritten Tales 2 worth getting? Definitely! Although it doesn't add much innovation to the series, this game offers a more complex and fine-tuned adventure than its predecessor." Hardcore Gamer: "If you love point and click adventures, The Book of Unwritten Tales 2 is everything you could possibly want and more. With stunning (and clever) graphics, a fully orchestrated soundtrack and top-notch voice acting, its production values are second to none, and it has writing chops to match." PC World called the puzzle design excellent but the graphics and audio occasionally spotty. It stated: "The Book of Unwritten Tales 2 is a reminder that while Telltale may have usurped the adventure genre, great traditional point-and-clicks can still be made."

References

External links
 
 

Adventure games
King Art Games games
Linux games
MacOS games
Video games developed in Germany
2015 video games
Fantasy video games
Point-and-click adventure games
Single-player video games
Video games featuring female protagonists
Windows games
Video game sequels
PlayStation 3 games
PlayStation 4 games
Wii U eShop games
Wii U games
Nintendo Switch games
Xbox 360 games
Xbox One games
The Adventure Company games
THQ Nordic games